The Inn National Development Party (abbr. INDP) is an Intha political party in Myanmar.

History
The party was established in 2010. In the November 2010 general elections it contested and won the Nyaung Shwe seat in the House of Representatives, as well as the two Nyaung Shwe seats in the Shan State Hluttaw and the Intha Ethnic Affairs Minister post.

References

Political parties in Myanmar
Political parties established in 2010
2010 establishments in Myanmar